The Presbyterian Church in Korea (GaeHyukHapDong I) is a Presbyterian denomination in South Korea. It adheres to the Apostles Creed and Westminster Confession. In 2004 it had 24,000 members in 179 congregations in 7 Presbyteries served by 193 ordained clergy. The main body is the General assembly.

References 

Presbyterian denominations in South Korea
Presbyterian denominations in Asia